Subdivisions of Turkmenistan include:

 Regions of Turkmenistan
 Districts of Turkmenistan

See also
 ISO 3166-2:TK

 
Turkmenistan